Public Enemies is a three-part British television drama series, written by playwright Tony Marchant, that is based upon the professional and private lives of Paula Radnor, a probation officer working within the British Probation Service, who is working with convicted murderer Eddie Mottram, who has served 10 years in prison for the murder of his 17-year-old girlfriend, and is struggling to adapt to life outside of prison. First broadcast on BBC One from 4 to 6 January 2012, the series stars Anna Friel as Radnor and Daniel Mays as Mottram, and encompasses a cast including Georgina Rich, Aisling Loftus, Peter Wight, Barbara Marten, Nicholas Gleaves, Joe Armstrong and Barnaby Kay. The series was directed by Dearbhla Walsh, with Will Gould acting as executive producer.

The complete series was released on DVD on 30 April 2012.

Critical reception
Patrick Smith of The Telegraph said of the first episode, "A hard-hitting, gloom-ridden drama about the inadequacies of the British probation service, this three-part serial – showing over consecutive nights – was created by the brilliant Tony Marchant, a British writer who’s no stranger to tackling unhappy, unsettling subjects. ... Just as the episode grew more tense, so too did Eddie Mottram (Daniel Mays). Readjusting to the outside world was proving difficult, and his old friends weren’t helping matters – as one of them pointed out to him: “I haven’t seen you in 10 years, mate. It ain’t just mobile phones that have moved on.” Sometimes the story felt contrived – you just knew that Mottram would proclaim his innocence – but, ultimately, the strength of the script and the credibility of the acting carried it through.”

Cast
 Anna Friel — Paula Radnor 
 Daniel Mays — Eddie Mottram 
 Lorraine Ashbourne — Marion Sharmer 
 Peter Wight — Ken Whiteley
 Barbara Marten — Kathy Whiteley 
 Georgina Rich — Kelly 
 Terence Maynard — Colin Bolt 
 Joel Fry — Darren Nunn
 Barnaby Kay — Will 
 Nicholas Gleaves — Trevor Brotherton 
 Joe Armstrong — Ben Somers 
 Romy Irving — Abbey 
 Abbie Fox — Jessie
 Glen Davies — Philip Pointer 
 Aisling Loftus — Jade 
 Nick Blood — Glen Smithfield 
 Roy Smiles — Eddie Stiles 
 Ian Burfield — DCI Andy Parkham

Episodes

References

External links

2010s British drama television series
2010s British crime television series
2012 British television series debuts
2012 British television series endings
BBC television dramas
2010s British television miniseries
Television series by Endemol
Television series by Tiger Aspect Productions
English-language television shows